Ana (Cyrillic: Ана) is a version of the female given name Anna meaning "favour" or "grace".

In Croatia, the name Ana was the second most common feminine given name, or among the top ten most common, in almost all decades for which there is census data.

People
Ana (American singer) (born 1974), Cuban-born American singer
Ana Achúcarro (born 1962), Spanish astroparticle physicist
Ana Alexander (born 1954), Cuban long jumper
Ana Ida Alvares (born 1965), Brazilian volleyball player
Ana Lily Amirpour (born 1980), Iranian-American film director, screenwriter, producer and actress
Ana Antonijević (born 1987), Serbian volleyball player
Ana Maria Archila, Colombian-American activist and politician
Ana de Armas (born 1988), Cuban actress
Ana Maria Bamberger (born 1966), Romanian physician and playwright
Ana Beatriz (born 1985), Brazilian racing driver
Ana Beatriz Barros (born 1982), Brazilian model
Ana P. Barros, American civil and environmental engineer
Ana Bebić (born 1986), Croatian singer
Ana Bjelica (born 1992), Serbian volleyball player
Ana Maria Braga (born 1949), Brazilian presenter
Ana Cannas da Silva (born 1968), Portuguese mathematician
Ana Caraiani, Romanian-American mathematician
Ana Cardus (born 1943), Mexican ballerina and ballet master
Ana Cortés (1895–1998), Chilean painter
Ana Dabović (born 1989), Serbian basketball player
Ana Debelić (born 1994), Croatian handball player
Ana García D'Atri (born 1967), Spanish editor, journalist and politician
Ana Díaz (born 1954), Cuban volleyball player
Ana Drev (born 1985), Slovenian alpine skier
Ana Družić (born 1992), Croatian footballer
Ana Free (born 1987), English-Portuguese singer
Ana Galindo (born 2003), Mexican rhythmic gymnast
Ana Maria García (born 1957), Cuban volleyball player
Ana Gasteyer (born 1967), American stage, film and television actress
Ana Girardot (born 1988), French stage, film and television actress
Ana Simina Grigoriu (born 1981), Romanian-born Canadian-German electronic musician
Ana Hernández (born 1962), Cuban basketball player
Ana Hickmann (born 1981), Brazilian model and TV host
Ana Ivanovic (born 1987), Serbian tennis player
Ana Jelušić (born 1986), Croatian alpine skier
Ana Johnsson (born 1977), Swedish singer
Ana Kasparian (born 1986), American political commentator and media host
Ana Khouri (born 1981), Brazilian jewelry designer and sculptor
Ana Kojić (born 1997), Serbian handball player
Ana Lazarević (born 1991), Serbian volleyball player
Ana Clara Lima (born 1997), Brazilian television presenter and reporter
Ana Martín (born 1945), Mexican actress, singer, and model
Ana Matronic (born 1974), US singer with the Scissor Sisters
Ana Mendoza (swimmer) (born 1970), Mexican breaststroke swimmer
Ana de Mendoza, Princess of Eboli, Spanish aristocrat
Ana Maria Micu (born 1979), Romanian visual artist
Ana Mijic, Serbian hydrologist
Ana Milagros Parra, Venezuelan political scientist
Ana Moura (born 1979), Portuguese singer
Ana Nikolić (born 1978), Serbian pop-folk singer
Ana Nogueira, American actress
Ana Beatriz Nogueira, Brazilian actress
Ana Catarina Nogueira, Portuguese professional padel player
Ana Flavia Nogueira, Brazilian chemist
Ana Novković (born 1965), Serbian politician
Ana Obregón (born 1955), Spanish singer and dancer
Ana Ortiz (born 1971), American actress and singer
Ana Medina, Venezuela's ambassador to Poland appointed by the National Assembly
Ana Mocanu (born 1937), Romanian volleyball player
Ana Osterman (born 1940), Slovene politician
Ana Pascu (born 1944), Romanian fencer and sport leader
Ana Paula Arósio (born 1975), Brazilian model and actress
Ana Paula Padrão (born 1965), Brazilian journalist and TV host
Ana Popović (born 1976), Serbian blues guitarist and singer
Ana Quezada, American politician
Ana María Ramírez (born 1948), Peruvian volleyball player
Ana González de Recabarren (born 1925), Chilean human rights activist
Ana Reeves (born 1948), Chilean actress
Ana Richa (born 1966), Brazilian volleyball player
Ana Estefanía Dominga Riglos (1788–1870), Argentine patriot
Ana María Sánchez de Ríos (born 1959), Peruvian diplomat
Ana Rodriguez (Miss Texas USA) (born 1986), American beauty pageant contestant
Ana Roxanne (born 1987), American musician and singer
Ana Sasso, Croatian model
Ana Sršen, Croatian swimmer
Ana Šimić, Croatian high jumper
Ana Mirela Țermure (born 1975), Romanian javelin thrower
Ana Uribe, Colombian muralist and painter
Ana Vidjen (born 1931), Croatian sculptress
Ana Vidović, Croatian guitarist
Ana Voog (born 1966), American musician and Internet personality
Ana Vrljić, Croatian tennis player
Ana Zaninović, Croatian taekwondo practitioner

Fictional characters
Ana Amari, a character in the video game Overwatch
Ana Bray, a character in the video game Destiny 2
Ana Khesarian, a character in The Promise, 2016

See also

Anna (given name)
Ant (name)

References

Spanish feminine given names
Portuguese feminine given names
Croatian feminine given names
Serbian feminine given names
Romanian feminine given names
Slovene feminine given names
Bulgarian feminine given names
English feminine given names
Filipino feminine given names
Macedonian feminine given names
Georgian feminine given names